David M. DePriest (born September 29, 1973 in Honolulu, Hawaii) is a former American professional darts player who competed plays in Professional Darts Corporation events. He was born in Honolulu, Hawaii but now resides in Grand Rapids, Michigan. He plays with 23-gram Barry Twomlow Golden darts.

DePriest qualified for the PDC World Series of Darts in 2006, winning the Chicago qualifier. He lost in the first round to Wayne Mardle. He also reached the quarter-finals of the USA National Championships, losing to eventual winner Tim Grossman as well as a semi-final place in the USA Dart Classic, a WDF ranked event.

External links
Stats on Darts Database

1973 births
Living people
American darts players
Professional Darts Corporation associate players
Sportspeople from Honolulu